Giral Lignite Power Plant (GLPL)or Giral Lignite Thermal Power Station (GLTPP) is a wholly owned subsidiary of Rajasthan Rajya Vidyut Utpadan Nigam Limited (RRVUNL). RRVUNL is a state government (Level 2 government in India) owned corporation working in field of power generation

Power plant
The thermal power station has installed capacity of 250 MW. Two identical units of 125 MW each, are built by Senbo Engineering Limited (SEL) on EPC basis with an estimated cost of Rs. 1690 Crores. It is a pit head plant. The fuel is lignite coal, which is procured from the mines just behind the plant. The fuel is supplied by Rajasthan State Mines & Minerals Limited (RSMML). An additive to fuel is limestone, which is added in pulverised form to the lignite, for the purpose of neutralising the sulphur Oxides (SOx), Sulphur Oxides are formed as a byproduct of combustion of lignite containing sulphur as its constituent. Limestonne is also supplied by RSMML. Lignite cost is nearly Rs. 400 per MT. 
This is the first plant of the country which is using Lime with lignite to control SOX level.
It was developed in 2 stages.

Installed capacity

See also 

 Suratgarh Super Thermal Power Plant
 Kota Super Thermal Power Plant
 Chhabra Thermal Power Plant

References 

Coal-fired power stations in Rajasthan
Barmer district
2003 establishments in Rajasthan
Energy infrastructure completed in 2003